Kolakaluru railway station (station code: KLX), is an Indian Railways station in Tenali of Guntur district in Andhra Pradesh. It lies on the Howrah–Chennai main line and is administered under Vijayawada railway division of South Central Railway zone.

Classification 
In terms of earnings and outward passengers handled, Kolakaluru is categorized as a Halt Grade-2 (HG-2) railway station. Based on the re–categorization of Indian Railway stations for the period of 2017–18 and 2022–23, an HG–2 category station earns between  lakh and handles  passengers.

References 

Railway stations in Guntur district
Vijayawada railway division